Blanche of Castile (4 March 1188 – 27 November 1252) was Queen of France by marriage to Louis VIII. She acted as regent twice during the reign of her son, Louis IX: during his minority from 1226 until 1234, and during his absence from 1248 until 1252. She was born in Palencia, Spain, in 1188, the third daughter of Alfonso VIII, King of Castile, and Eleanor of England, sister of King Richard I of England and King John of England.

Early life
In her youth, she visited the Abbey of Santa María la Real de Las Huelgas, founded by her parents, several times. In consequence of the Treaty of Le Goulet between Philip Augustus and John of England, Blanche's sister, Urraca, was betrothed to Philip's son, Louis. After meeting the two sisters, their grandmother Eleanor of Aquitaine (who had been a queen consort of France herself) judged that Blanche's personality was more fit to fulfil the role. In the spring of 1200, Eleanor crossed the Pyrenees with her and brought her to France instead.

Appearance
Eleanor of Aquitaine judged that Urraca, Blanche's sister, was more beautiful than Blanche, although Catherine Hanley states we have no knowledge about what Blanche looked like.

Marriage
On 22 May 1200, the marriage treaty was finally signed. King John ceded, along with his niece Blanche, the fiefs of Issoudun and Graçay, together with those that André de Chauvigny, lord of Châteauroux, held in Berry, of the English crown. The marriage was celebrated the next day at Port-Mort on the right bank of the Seine, in John's domains, as those of Philip lay under an interdict. Blanche was twelve years of age, and Louis was only a year older, so the marriage had to wait to be consummated a few years later. Blanche bore her first child in 1205.

During the English barons' rebellion of 1215–16 against King John, it was Blanche's English ancestry as granddaughter to Henry II that led to Louis being offered the throne of England as Louis I. However, with the death of John in October 1216, the barons changed their allegiance to John's son, the nine-year-old Henry.

Louis continued to claim the English crown in her right, only to find a united nation against him. Philip Augustus refused to help his son, and Blanche was his sole support. Blanche raised money from her father-in-law by threatening to put up her children as hostages. She established herself at Calais and organized two fleets, one of which was commanded by Eustace the Monk, and an army under Robert of Courtenay. With French forces defeated at Lincoln in May 1217 and then routed on their way back to their London stronghold, Louis desperately needed the reinforcements from France. On 24 August, the English fleet destroyed the French fleet carrying those reinforcements off Sandwich and Louis was forced to sue for peace.

Regency
Philip died in July 1223, and Louis VIII and Blanche were crowned on 6 August. Upon Louis' death in November 1226 from dysentery, he left Blanche, by then 38, regent and guardian of his children. Of her twelve or thirteen children, six had died, and Louis, the heir – afterwards the sainted Louis IX – was but twelve years old. She had him crowned within a month of his father's death in Reims and forced reluctant barons to swear allegiance to him. The situation was critical, since Louis VIII had died without having completely subdued his southern nobles. The king's minority made the Capetian domains even more vulnerable. To gain support, she released Ferdinand, Count of Flanders, who had been in captivity since the Battle of Bouvines. She ceded land and castles to Philip I, Count of Boulogne, son of King Philip II of France and his controversial wife, Agnes of Merania.

Several key barons, led by Peter Mauclerc, refused to recognize the coronation of the young king. Shortly after the coronation, Blanche and Louis were traveling south of Paris and nearly captured. Blanche appealed to the people of Paris to protect their king. The citizens lined the roads and protected him as he returned.

Helped by Theobald IV of Champagne and the papal legate to France, Romano Bonaventura, she organized an army. Its sudden appearance brought the nobles momentarily to a halt. Twice more did Blanche have to muster an army to protect Capetian interests against rebellious nobles and Henry III of England. Blanche organized a surprise attack in the winter. In January 1229, she led her forces to attack Mauclerc and force him to recognize the king. She accompanied the army herself and helped collect wood to keep the soldiers warm. Not everyone was happy with her administration. Her enemies called her "Dame Hersent" (the wolf in the Roman de Renart)

In 1229, she was responsible for the Treaty of Paris, in which Raymond VII, Count of Toulouse, submitted to Louis. By the terms of the agreement, his daughter and heir, Joan, married Blanche's son, Alphonse, and the county could only pass to his heirs. He gave up all the lands conquered by Simon de Montfort to the crown of France. It also meant the end of the Albigensian Crusade.

To prevent Henry III of England from gaining more French lands through marriage, Blanche denied him the first two brides he sought. In 1226, he sought to marry Yolande of Brittany, Mauclerc's daughter. Blanche instead forced her father to give Yolande to Blanche's son John. When Henry became engaged to Joan, Countess of Ponthieu, Blanche lobbied the Pope to deny the marriage based on consanguinity, denying the dispensation Henry sought.

In 1230, Henry III came to invade France. At the cost of some of the crown's influence in Poitou, Blanche managed to keep the English Queen mother Isabella, Countess of Angoulême, and her second husband, Hugh X of Lusignan, from supporting the English side. However, Mauclerc did support the English and Brittany rebelled against the crown in 1230. Originally, the English landed in Brittany with 275 knights, men at arms, and barons to meet his ally Peter I, Duke of Brittany. The campaign began well for Henry III, who probably recruited foot soldiers on the continent as he brought 7,800 marks with him. On the other hand, Blanche's troops were insubordinate to her and refused to serve beyond the 40 day feudal contract; most disbanded after 40 days. Philip I, Count of Boulogne, left the royal forces and proceeded to raid Champagne. Blanche had to chase Philip to try and stop him from raiding the important county, leaving Henry III to proceed without serious resistance.

Meanwhile, the Norman nobles were also in open rebellion against Blanche. However, instead of marching to help the Norman rebels, he followed the advice of his vassal, advisor, and former regent Hubert de Burgh, 1st Earl of Kent, and marched into Poitou. In any case, it appears that Henry's excursion to Aquitaine was not necessary despite the calls for help by Geoffrey Beauchamp, who probably panicked due to a slight rise in unrest in Aquitaine. Henry besieged Mirabeau and proceeded to Bordeaux, apparently "securing" the south while also losing massive amounts of money and being forced to take loans. What made it worse was that Aquitaine was not in any serious danger of being taken by the French because what remained of the French royal army was trying to quash a rebellion in Champagne, nowhere near Aquitaine.

Henry's military operation was still not a complete loss. He was able to get money, military engines, and bolts for crossbows along with the militia of La Réole. Henry marched north into Poitou but the gifts which Blanche had sent to Hugh X of Lusignan, Count of La Marche, and Raymond I, Viscount of Thouars, kept them loyal to the French. Although the local lords could not see Henry off, he was either unable or unwilling to commit to a large offensive investment and decided to return to Brittany, where he spent the remainder of his money on feasts. He proceeded to England having accomplished little. He lost money and prestige even if he had not taken significant casualties. Thus the rebellion died out, which helped establish Blanche and Louis as more stable rulers. Henry's failure to make any significant impact with his invasions ultimately discouraged Mauclerc's rebellion, and, by 1234, he was firm in his support of Louis.

St. Louis owed his realm to his mother and remained under her influence for the duration of her life.

Queen mother
Louis began to take part in political affairs by declaring his maturity, but Blanche was very influential and powerful in politics and court affairs, and her son did not withhold anything from her. No one dared to criticize the Queen Mother. In 1233, Raymond of Toulouse was starting to chafe under the terms of the treaty of Paris, thus Blanche sent one of her knights, Giles of Flagy, to convince him to cooperate. Blanche heard through troubadours of the beauty, grace, and religious devotion of the daughters of Ramon Berenguer IV, Count of Provence, and assigned Giles a second mission to visit Provence. Giles found a much better reception in Provence than in Toulouse. Upon his return to Paris, Blanche decided that a Provençal marriage would suit her son and help keep Toulouse in check.  In 1234, Louis married Margaret of Provence, who was the eldest of the four daughters of Ramon, Count of Provence, and Beatrice of Savoy.

She did not have a good relationship with her daughter-in-law, perhaps due to the controlling relationship herself had with her son, and she wanted to maintain control of her son and the court. To maintain better control over the new queen, Blanche dismissed the family and servants who had come to her wedding before the couple reached Paris. Prior to the arrival of the new queen, Blanche was considered the beauty of the court, and had poems written about her beauty by the count of Champagne. In 1230, it was even rumoured that she was pregnant by Romano Bonaventura. The new queen drew the attention of the court and the king away from Blanche, so she sought to keep them apart as much as she could. Jean de Joinville tells of the time when Queen Margaret was giving birth and Blanche entered the room telling her son to leave saying "Come ye hence, ye do naught here". Queen Margaret then allegedly fainted out of distress. One contemporary biographer notes that when Queen Blanche was present in the royal household, she did not like Margaret and Louis to be together "except when he went to lie with her".

In 1239, Blanche insisted on a fair hearing for the Jews, who were under threat by increasing anti-semitism in France. She presided over a formal disputation in the king's court. Louis insisted on the burning of the Talmud and other Jewish books, but Blanche promised Rabbi Yechiel of Paris, who spoke for the Jews, that he and his goods were under her protection.

Second regency and death
In 1248, Blanche again became regent during Louis IX's absence on the Crusade, a project which she had strongly opposed. In the disasters which followed, she maintained peace while draining the land of men and money to aid her son in the East. She fell ill at Melun in November 1252 and was taken to Paris, but lived only a few days. She was buried at Maubuisson Abbey, which she had founded herself. Louis heard of her death in the following spring and reportedly did not speak to anyone for two days afterwards.

Patronage and learning
Blanche was a patron of the arts and owned a variety of books, both in French and in Latin. Some of these were meant as teaching tools for her son. Le Miroir de l'Ame was dedicated to Blanche. It instructs queens to rigorously practice Christian virtues in daily life. She oversaw the education of her children, all of whom studied Latin. She also insisted on lessons in Christian morals for all of them. Both Louis and Isabelle, her only surviving daughter, were canonized.

The chanson Amours ou trop tard me suis pris, a prayer to the Virgin Mary, is often attributed to Blanche.

Issue
 Blanche (1205 – died soon after).
 Philip (9 September 1209 – before July 1218), betrothed in July 1215 to Agnes of Donzy.
 Alphonse (b. and d. Lorrez-le-Bocage, 26 January 1213), twin of John.
 John (b. and d. Lorrez-le-Bocage, 26 January 1213), twin of Alphonse.
 Louis IX (Poissy, 25 April 1214 – 25 August 1270, Tunis), King of France as successor to his father.
 Robert (25 September 1216 – 9 February 1250, killed in battle, Manssurah, Egypt), Count of Artois.
 Philip (20 February 1218 – 1220).
 John (21 July 1219 – 1232), Count of Anjou and Maine; betrothed in March 1227 to Yolande of Brittany.
 Alphonse (Poissy, 11 November 1220 – 21 August 1271, Corneto), Count of Poitou and Auvergne, and by marriage, of Toulouse.
 Philip Dagobert (20 February 1222 – 1232).
 Isabelle (March 1224 – 23 February 1270).
 Etienne (end 1225 – early 1227).
 Charles (end 1226/early 1227 – 7 January 1285), Count of Anjou and Maine, by marriage Count of Provence and Folcalquier, and King of Sicily.

Literature
Blanche of Castile is mentioned in François Villon's 15th century poem Ballade des Dames du Temps Jadis (Ballad of Ladies of Times Past), together with other famous women of history and mythology.  Blanche's selection as bride for Louis and travel to France is noted in Elizabeth Chadwick's The Autumn Throne.

Blanche and Isabella of Angoulême are the main characters in Jean Plaidy's novel The Battle of the Queens, and she is briefly mentioned in Marcel Proust's Swann's Way.

Blanche is a key character in the novel "Four Sisters, All Queens", by Sherry Jones. She is also a central antagonist in the fictional middle grade novel, 'The Inquisitor's Tale', Written by Adam Gidwitz.

The character Blanche of Castile is featured in the Shakespearean history play King John.

Blanche is mentioned disparagingly by a character (Doctor Cottard) in Proust's novel, "Swann’s Way".

In popular culture
An image of Blanche of Castile has been used on the home kit of French Rugby union team Stade Français since the 2008 season.

During the 1950s French restaurateur Noël Corbu claimed that Blanche of Castile had deposited a treasure in Rennes-le-Château that was later discovered by Bérenger Saunière during the late 19th century. This was later utilised by Pierre Plantard in his development of the Priory of Sion mythology.

Notes

Sources

Further reading
Aside from the works of Joinville and William of Nangis, see Élie Berger, "Histoire de Blanche de Castille, reine de France", in Bibliothèque des Ecoles françaises d'Athènes et de Rome, vol. lxx. (Paris, 1895); Le Nain de Tillemont, "Vie de Saint Louis", ed. by J. de Gaulle for the Société de l'histoire de France (6 vols., 1847–1851); and Paulin Paris, "Nouvelles recherches sur les mœurs de la reine Blanche et de Thibaud", in Cabinet historique (1858).

External links

 Women's Biography: Blanche of Castile, queen of France, epistolae.ccnmtl.columbia.edu; accessed 14 April 2014.

|-

1188 births
1252 deaths
13th-century women rulers
13th-century French people
13th-century French women
13th-century rulers in Europe
12th-century nobility from León and Castile
13th-century Castilians
Castilian infantas
Countesses of Artois
French queens consort
Castilian House of Burgundy
House of Capet
People from Palencia
Regents of France
Queen mothers
Women in medieval European warfare
Women in war in France
Women in 13th-century warfare
Louis VIII of France
Daughters of kings
Royal reburials